Norway was the host nation for the 1952 Winter Olympics in Oslo.

By winning 7 gold medals, Norway had the most golds at these games. This would be the last time a host country would win the most gold medals at the Winter Olympics until Canada won the most gold medals at the 2010 Winter Olympics in Vancouver.

Medalists

Alpine skiing

Men

Women

Bobsleigh

Cross-country skiing

Men

Men's 4 × 10 km relay

Women

Figure skating

Women

Pairs

Ice hockey

The tournament was run in a round-robin format with nine teams participating.

Norway 2-3 USA
Norway 0-6 Czechoslovakia
Norway 2-4 Sweden
Norway 2-7 Switzerland
Norway 2-5 Finland
Norway 2-6 Germany FR
Norway 2-11 Canada
Norway 3-4 Poland

Nordic combined 

Events:
 18 km cross-country skiing
 normal hill ski jumping

The cross-country skiing part of this event was combined with the main medal event, meaning that athletes competing here were skiing for two disciplines at the same time. Details can be found above in this article, in the cross-country skiing section.

The ski jumping (normal hill) event was held separate from the main medal event of ski jumping, results can be found in the table below (athletes were allowed to perform three jumps, the best two jumps were counted and are shown here).

Ski jumping

Speed skating

Men

 1 No bronze medal awarded due to Helgesen finishing behind his direct opponent during his race

References

 Olympic Winter Games 1952, full results by sports-reference.com

Nations at the 1952 Winter Olympics
1952
Olympics